The men's 100 metre butterfly S12 event at the 2020 Paralympic Games took place on 3 September 2021, at the Tokyo Aquatics Centre.

Heats
The swimmers with the top eight times, regardless of heat, advanced to the final.

Final

References

Swimming at the 2020 Summer Paralympics